Matías Andrés Sosa (born 6 July 1995) is an Argentine professional footballer who plays as a midfielder for Talleres de Remedios de Escalada.

Career
After being an unused substitute on two occasions in 2015 and 2016 versus Godoy Cruz and Unión Santa Fe, Sosa made his professional debut on 21 June 2017 in the league against Temperley; prior to making another appearance days later in a 1–0 win over Gimnasia y Esgrima. In the following August, he scored the first goal of his senior career in a Copa Argentina victory away to Temperley. On 1 January 2018, Sosa joined Primera B Metropolitana side Atlanta on loan. His first match for Atlanta arrived on 3 February in a 2–1 defeat to Platense. A loan move to Brown followed in September.

Career statistics
.

References

External links

1995 births
Living people
Footballers from Buenos Aires
Argentine footballers
Association football midfielders
Argentine Primera División players
Primera B Metropolitana players
Defensa y Justicia footballers
Club Atlético Atlanta footballers
Club Atlético Brown footballers
Talleres de Remedios de Escalada footballers